Bernard Blair (May 24, 1801 – May 7, 1880) was an American politician and a U.S. Representative from New York.

Biography
Born in Williamstown, Massachusetts, Blair was the son of William and Sally (Train) Blair. He attended the public schools and pursued preparatory studies. He was graduated from Williams College, Williamstown, Massachusetts, in 1825. He married Charlotte Lansing.

Career
Blair moved to Salem, Washington County, New York, in 1825.  He studied law, was admitted to the bar in 1828 and commenced practice in Salem, subsequently being admitted as counselor and solicitor in chancery. He was a delegate to Whig National Convention from New York, 1839.

Elected as a Whig to the Twenty-seventh Congress, Blair was United States Representative for the twelfth district of New York and served from March 4, 1841, to March 3, 1843.  After his term in Congress, he discontinued the practice of his profession and engaged in business pursuits.

Death
Blair died in Salem, Washington County, New York, on May 7, 1880 (age 78 years, 349 days). He is interred at Evergreen Cemetery, Salem, New York.

References

External links

1801 births
1880 deaths
People from Williamstown, Massachusetts
Williams College alumni
New York (state) lawyers
Whig Party members of the United States House of Representatives from New York (state)
People from Salem, New York
19th-century American politicians
19th-century American lawyers